Woodside, near Tuckahoe, Virginia in Henrico County, Virginia, was built in 1858.  It is a Greek Revival style villa, in the countryside but not a farmhouse.  It was a family home of the Wickham family of Richmond.  It was listed on the National Register of Historic Places in 1973.

The house, along with open area around it, has been permanently protected by an easement.

It is located southwest of Tuckahoe off VA 157, at what is now 510 S. Gaskins Rd.

References

Houses on the National Register of Historic Places in Virginia
Houses completed in 1858
Houses in Henrico County, Virginia
Greek Revival houses in Virginia
National Register of Historic Places in Henrico County, Virginia